The City of Bradford Metropolitan District Council elections were held on Thursday, 7 May 1992, with one third of the council as well as a double vacancy in Heaton to be elected. Labour retained control of the council.

Election result

This result had the following consequences for the total number of seats on the council after the elections:

Ward results

References

1992 English local elections
1992
1990s in West Yorkshire